Jack Frost is a 1979 Christmas, Winter, and Groundhog Day stop motion animated television special produced by Rankin/Bass Productions. It was directed by Jules Bass and Arthur Rankin, Jr., written by Romeo Muller, narrated by Buddy Hackett, and starring the voices of Robert Morse, Debra Clinger, and Paul Frees. The special premiered on NBC on December 13, 1979, and tells the tale of Jack Frost and his adventures as a human. It airs annually on AMC as part of its Best Christmas Ever programming block.

Plot
The story is narrated by a groundhog named Pardon-Me-Pete, who has a deal with Jack Frost to extend winter by 6 weeks, letting him sleep that much longer. Pete starts to talk about the legend of Jack Frost.

It all starts when Jack Frost, an immortal winter sprite, falls in love with a human girl named Elisa, who proclaims her love for Jack after he rescues her when Kubla Kraus, an evil Cossack king who lives in his castle on Miserable Mountain with his iron horse Klangstomper, his clockwork butler Fetch-Kvetch, his army of Keh-Nights, and a ventriloquist's dummy named Dommy as his sidekick, all made of iron since no human or animal could stand to live with him due to his arrogance and greed, cracks the ice she is standing on. Jack asks Father Winter if he can become human in order to be with her. Father Winter gives him a chance but warns that Jack must prove he can succeed as a human, by earning a house, a horse, a bag of gold, and a wife by the first sign of spring.

Jack agrees and turns human, assuming the identity of Jack Snip. He runs a tailor shop in the town of January Junction with two friends who also turned human, Snip the snowflake maker and Holly the snow gypsy. Snip and Holly were sent by Father Winter to ensure Jack does not get into trouble. Elisa is charmed by "Jack Snip", but she harbors romantic dreams of Sir Ravenal Rightfellow, a "knight in golden armor".

Elisa is soon kidnapped by Kraus and taken to his castle. Kraus also possesses all the brick, gold, and timber that January Junction used to have. After Elisa is rescued by Sir Ravenal, Kraus vows to destroy January Junction by sending one-thousand Keh-Nights in an attempt to recapture his bride and throws Jack, Snip, and Holly in the dungeon.

Jack gives up his humanity in order to whip up the biggest blizzard ever, freezing Kraus and his 1,000 Keh-Nights in the castle. Snip and Holly change back to sprites as well. This tactic works until Groundhog Day arrives. As the sky is overcast with no sun to cast shadows, Jack Frost uses his magic shadow to scare Pete back into hibernation, and continues whipping up the storm.

Finally, with only 1 hour left before the arrival of spring, Jack returns to human form to stop Kraus by tricking his Keh-Nights into walking off the icy mountain to their destruction by imitating Dommy. Afterward, Jack causes Kraus to fall out of his castle and Father Winter literally blows him far away from Miserable Mountain, leaving Jack to claim the gold for himself; tames Klangstomper, making him his horse; and the castle becomes his house.

He races off to ask Elisa's parents for her hand in marriage, but during his absence, she has fallen in love with Sir Ravenal, and he with her. Jack becomes a spirit again for good, and blows ice onto Elisa's wedding bouquet, turning it white. When asked about the change, she sheds a tear saying "An old friend just kissed the bride." Snip calls out to Jack that winter wouldn't be the same without him.

Before heading back to sleep, Pete says that Jack Frost still plays his tricks on him to ensure that there are 6 more weeks of winter, but he doesn't mind because he enjoys the extra sleep.

Voice cast
 Robert Morse as Jack Frost
 Buddy Hackett as Pardon-Me-Pete
 Debra Clinger as Elisa
 Paul Frees as Father Winter, Kubla Kraus
 Dave Garroway as Groundhog Day Reporter
 Dina Lynn as Holly
 Sonny Melendrez as Sir Ravenal Rightfellow
 Don Messick as Snip
 Larry Storch as Papa
 Dee Stratton as Mama

Crew
 Produced and Directed by Arthur Rankin, Jr. and Jules Bass
 Written by Romeo Muller
 Music and Lyrics by Maury Laws and Jules Bass
 Design: Paul Coker, Jr.
 Associate Producer: Masaki Iizuka
 "Animagic" Production Supervisors: Akikazu Kono, Ichiro Komuro, Hiroshi Tabata, Seiichi Araki
 Sound Recording: John Curcio, Dave Iveland, Glenn Berger, Robert Elder
 Sound Effects: Tom Clack
 Music Arranged and Conducted by Maury Laws
© 1979 Rankin/Bass Productions, Inc.

Home media
The licensing for Jack Frost was relatively lax for many years and as early as the early 1990s, independent discount home video distributors produced VHS (and later DVD) copies from 16 mm prints. The special did not, as occasionally stated, lapse into the public domain; the Copyright Act of 1976 had taken effect by the time the special was published, which granted Rankin/Bass and its successors automatic copyrights of 75 years, and the program had a valid copyright notice to begin with.

In the fall of 2008, Warner Bros. via Warner Home Video (owners of the post-September 1974 Rankin/Bass library) re-released the special as an "official version" on DVD, using a digitally remastered 35 mm print as the master.

See also
List of Rankin/Bass Productions films

References

External links
 

1979 animated films
1979 films
1979 in American television
1979 television specials
1970s American animated films
1970s American television specials
1970s animated short films
1970s animated television specials
Christmas television specials
Films scored by Maury Laws
Films based on folklore
Television shows directed by Jules Bass
Films directed by Arthur Rankin Jr.
NBC television specials
Operation Prime Time
Stop-motion animated short films
Rankin/Bass Productions television specials
Stop-motion animated television shows
Jack Frost
Groundhog Day
Television shows written by Romeo Muller
American Christmas television specials